Kevin Paul Borseth (born June 9, 1954) is the current head women's basketball coach at The University of Wisconsin–Green Bay.

Career
A native of Bessemer, Michigan, he has compiled a 477–186 record in 22 years as a head basketball coach. He has compiled twenty consecutive winning campaigns, and fifteen 20-win seasons. His teams have either won or shared thirteen conference titles, and won their conference tournament eight times. In sixteen of his twenty-one seasons, his teams have gone to the postseason—including thirteen NCAA appearances with only three WNIT appearances.

Gogebic Community College
Borseth began coaching at Gogebic Community College in Ironwood, Michigan.

Michigan Technological University
He then spent 11 years as head coach of the women's basketball program at Michigan Technological University in Houghton, Michigan.During his tenure, Borseth accumulated a 225–97 (.699) record, claimed four Great Lakes Intercollegiate Athletic Conference (GLIAC) championships, and qualified for the NCAA Division II Tournament seven times. During the 1992–93 campaign, Borseth led the Huskies to a 30–3 mark en route to a third-place finish in the NCAA Division II Tournament.

University of Wisconsin–Green Bay
He then served as head women's basketball coach for the Green Bay Phoenix at the University of Wisconsin–Green Bay from 1997 to 2007. He posted a 216–62 record with 20-win seasons in eight of nine years during his tenure. His 2006–2007 team ranks as the best in school history. The team went 29–4, including a perfect 16–0 in conference play, and established school and conference records for wins. From December 7 to March 18, UWGB had the longest winning streak in the nation at twenty-six consecutive wins.

Michigan
Soon after taking over Michigan, he became well known after the video of a very emotional news conference, which took place February 28, 2008 after a dramatic loss to Wisconsin, became a popular internet video. In the conference, Borseth started off by throwing his clipboard at the podium with intense force, then passionately complained about his team giving up a double-digit lead, failing to collect offensive rebounds and being called for a foul on what he considered a legitimate box-out.

In his first season at Michigan, the team improved from 10–20 to 19–14, enjoying their first winning season and postseason bid (Women's NIT) in six seasons. Borseth led the Wolverines to two more WNIT berths in the next three seasons and returned them to the NCAA tournament in 2012, where they lost in the first round.

Return to Green Bay
On April 4, 2012, Borseth announced he was resigning as Michigan's coach and returning to Green Bay to coach the Green Bay Phoenix women's basketball team at UW-Green Bay due to it being closer to his home. He was replaced by Kim Barnes Arico, who had spent the previous ten years at St. John's.

Coaching record

1. Cancelled due to the coronavirus pandemic

References

External links
http://www.mgoblue.com/sports/w-baskbl/mtt/borseth_kevin00.html
http://www.greenbayphoenix.com/ViewArticle.dbml?ATCLID=205409070
http://mgoblue.com/basketball-w/article.aspx?id=37328

1954 births
Living people
American women's basketball coaches
Basketball coaches from Michigan
Gogebic Community College alumni
Green Bay Phoenix women's basketball coaches
Junior college men's basketball players in the United States
Junior college women's basketball coaches in the United States
Lake Superior State Lakers men's basketball players
Michigan Wolverines women's basketball coaches
Michigan Tech Huskies women's basketball coaches
People from Bessemer, Michigan
American men's basketball players